DWXI may refer to the 2 flagship stations of Delta Broadcasting System, Inc. both licensed on Metro Manila, Philippines

 DWXI-AM, a radio station (1314 AM)
 DWDE-TV, a former callsign of television station (UHF Channel 35)